Keyhole Glacier is a glacier located in the central Baffin Mountains of northeastern Baffin Island, Nunavut, Canada.

See also
List of glaciers

References

Glaciers of Baffin Island
Arctic Cordillera